COPA-COGECA ( / Committee of Professional Agricultural Organisations-General Confederation of Agricultural Cooperatives), is the union of the two big agricultural umbrella organisations COPA and COGECA and the strongest interest group for European farmers. Founded in 1962 and headquartered in Brussels, its activity focus is on the Common Agricultural Policy and other policy areas relevant to farmers and agri-cooperatives, such as: food safety, animal health and welfare, plant health, environment, research and innovation, trade etc..

The current President of COPA is FNSEA President Christiane Lambert from France (since 2020),the current president of COGECA is Ramon Armengol of the cooperativas agro-alimentarias (since 2019), the Secretary General is Pekka Pesonen from Finland (since 2012).

History
On 6 September 1958, the first European representative organisation, COPA, was created.
On 24 September 1959, the agricultural cooperatives of the European Community created the European umbrella organisation, COGECA.
COPA's Secretariat was established in Brussels on 1 April 1959, merging with that of COGECA on 1 December 1962.

The COPA-COGECA opposed the European Union–Mercosur Free Trade Agreement. The COPA-COGECA said the impact of the free trade deal would be "devastating on the European farming family model".

References

External links

 Comité des Organisations Professionnelles Agricoles de la UE in ODIS - Online Database for Intermediary Structures 
 Archives of Comité des Organisations Professionnelles Agricoles de la UE in ODIS - Online Database for Intermediary Structures

Cross-European advocacy groups
Agricultural organisations based in Belgium
Lobbying in the European Union